Ryan's Mystery Playdate is an American children's television series created by Albie Hecht for Nickelodeon, and produced by PocketWatch. The series is based on the Ryan's World YouTube channel, which signed an advertising deal with PocketWatch in 2017. In the United States, the show's 20 episodes were acquired by Nick Jr. for a premiere date of April 19, 2019.

Series overview

Episodes

Season 1 (2019)

Season 2 (2019–20)

Season 3 (2020–21)

Season 4 (2021)

Special (2020)

References

Lists of Nickelodeon television series episodes
Lists of American children's television series episodes